This list of sovereign states and dependent territories in the Indian Ocean consists of 38 countries, with 13 in Africa, 22 in Asia, and 1 in Oceania that either border on or are in the Indian Ocean, as well as 2 European countries which administer several dependencies or overseas territories in the region.

Indian Ocean Members

Sovereign states
The states listed in this table either border on or are in the Indian Ocean, which here includes the Red Sea and the Persian Gulf.

Recognised states
The following fully recognised states are all member states of the United Nations.

States with limited or no international recognition

The entity listed below has declared itself to be a sovereign state and exercises control over some territory but has limited or no recognition from other states and is not a member state of the United Nations.

Constituent parts of sovereign states

Dependent territories of sovereign states

See also
List of Antarctic and subantarctic islands
List of Caribbean countries by population
List of island countries
List of islands in the Indian Ocean
List of islands of Africa
List of sovereign states and dependent territories in Oceania

References

Indian Ocean

Africa
Eurasia
Oceania